Astromantic is the third studio album by the Japanese hip-hop group M-Flo. It was released on May 26, 2004, through Rhythm Zone. Remixes of songs from this album were released as Astromantic Charm School. The album spawned three singles featuring different singers: "Reeewind!" with Crystal Kay, "Miss You" with Melody, and "The Love Bug" with BoA. 

Commercially, the album peaked at number two on the Oricon Albums Chart and was certified platinum by the Recording Industry Association of Japan (RIAJ) for physical sales in June 2004.

Background 
Astromantic was released via Avex's record label Rhythm Zone on May 26, 2004, and marks the group's first studio album in over three years, since March 2001's Expo Expo. It is the group's first album without Lisa as the vocalist since her departure from the trio in April 2002. Instead of finding a new vocalist the band started to collaborate with different singers, with each collaboration credited to "m-flo loves" the featured artist. Remixes of songs from this album were later released on the Astromantic Charm School remix album, released on September 15, 2004.

Reception 
Astromantic reached number 2 on the Oricon Albums Chart and stayed on the chart for a total of 34 weeks. The album sold 330,497 copies by the end of 2004, and ranked at number 42 on the year-end Oricon Albums Chart.

Track listing 
The Third Impact
Miss You [M-Flo Loves Melody. & Ryohei Yamamoto]
Starstruck - "The Return of the Luvbytes" [M-Flo Loves Ai, Emi Hinouchi & Rum (Heartsdales)]
How to Be Astromantic
Vanessa [M-Flo Loves Bloodest Saxophone]
Way U Move [M-Flo Loves Dragon Ash]
Get On! [M-Flo Loves Crystal Kay]
Astrosexy [M-Flo Loves Chemistry]
Listen to Your Heart
The Love Bug [M-Flo Loves BoA]
Life Is Beautiful [M-Flo Loves Double & Toku]
I Wanna Be Down [M-Flo Loves Ryuichi Sakamoto]
Rendezvous 2014
Cosmic Night Run [M-Flo Loves Maki Nomiya & Crazy Ken Band]
Reeewind! [M-Flo Loves Crystal Kay]
Uchu No Uouo (Woah Woah of Space) [M-Flo Loves Boy-Ken & Black Bottom Brass Band]
Curtain Call

Charts and certifications

Album charts

Certifications

Release history

References

M-Flo albums
Avex Group albums
2004 albums